Arthur Milton Robins (born October 23, 1953) is an American painter and sculptor. He is known for his series of Pool Room paintings as well as his involvement in Bery v. City of New York, a federal lawsuit settled by the Supreme Court of the United States in 1997.

Career 
Robins is known for his Pool Room paintings, which he says were inspired by his uncle’s pool room in Brooklyn, New York.  He is also known for his vast array and depiction of cityscapes, inspired by New York City living. Art critic Donald Kuspit called his series of Tunnel Paintings,  “A new breakthrough in Expressionist Painting History.’’

In 1980, Robins performed a one-man show in the lobby of a U.S. federal courthouse, which was so controversial it made news across the country. The Metropolitan Museum of Art and the Museum of the City of New York both own works by Robins.

Bery v. City of New York 
In 1993, Robins was a co-founder of A.R.T.I.S.T (Artists Response To Illegal State Tactics) and a main litigant of a First Amendment lawsuit that was settled by the Supreme Court of the United States in 1997. This settlement opened the way for thousands of artists in New York City to show and sell their work on the street of New York City without a permit or license.

2005 controversy 
In 2005, Robins was accused of illegally placing art on the walls of the Metropolitan Museum of Art. The works supposedly threatened the President George W. Bush and included a written letter and white powder. Arthur was detained at the Museum. Later that night, 5 detectives entered Arthur’s apartment and interrogated him at length. Arthur recorded this event and the story ended up on the front page of The New York Times. Robins was never charged. This story led him to be asked to play himself in a film called This Revolution, a docudrama on events related to this issue.

Selected exhibitions 

 Neuberger Museum
 John McEnroe Gallery
 Museum of the City of New York 
 La MaMa | La Galleria
 New World Art Center
 U.S. Open Pool Championship
 Icosahedron Gallery
 Steven Adams Gallery

References

Painters from New York (state)
Sculptors from New York (state)
1953 births
Living people
American male painters
20th-century American painters
20th-century American male artists
21st-century American painters
21st-century American male artists
20th-century American sculptors
21st-century American sculptors
American male sculptors